The Santa Ana Handicap is a Thoroughbred horse race run at annually Santa Anita Park in Arcadia, California during the third week of March.  The race is open to fillies and mares, age four and up, willing to race one and one-eighth miles on the turf.

A Grade III event, it currently offers a purse of $200,000.

In 1973 the race was run in two divisions. In 1981, 1982, 1983 and 1986, it was raced on dirt.

Records
Speed  record: (on turf)
 1:46.21 – Citronnade (2007)

Most wins:
 No horse has won this race more than once.

Most wins by an owner:
 3 – Juddmonte Farms (1995, 2000, 2008)

Most wins by a jockey:
 4 – Bill Shoemaker (1972, 1974, 1984, 1987)
 4 – Kent Desormeaux (1991, 1994, 1998, 1999)

Most wins by a trainer:
 8 – Robert J. Frankel (1992, 1994, 1995, 1999, 2000, 2005, 2007, 2008)

Winners of the Santa Ana Handicap since 1968 

 In 1988, Fitzwilliam Place finished first but was disqualified and set back to second.
 In 1991 there was a Dead heat for win.
 In 2004, Megahertz finished first but was disqualified and set back to last.

References
 The 2008 Santa Ana Handicap at the NTRA

Horse races in California
Santa Anita Park
Graded stakes races in the United States
Flat horse races for four-year-old fillies
Mile category horse races for fillies and mares
Turf races in the United States
Recurring sporting events established in 1968
1968 establishments in California